Furca (Latin for "fork"), plural forms furcae or furcas, or its diminutive, furcula, may refer to:

Biology
Furca (genus), a prehistoric arthropod 
Furca (springtail), an anatomical structure in springtail entognaths.
 Caudal furca ("tail fork"), part of the telson of some crustaceans
Furcula, the wishbone of birds and some dinosaurs
Furcula (moth) a genus of Noctuid moths
 Any small forked structure of animal anatomy

Other uses
Forked cross, a cross in Gothic architecture
Furca (punishment), a cross-like instrument for punishment
Furcas, a demonic mythological character
Furca, a carrying pole for the sarcina of Roman legionaries

See also
Fork (disambiguation)